Mikhaylovka is a rural locality (a village) in Abdrashitovsky Selsoviet, Alsheyevsky District, Bashkortostan, Russia. The population was 19 as of 2010. There is 1 street.

Geography 
Mikhaylovka is located 35 km northwest of Rayevsky (the district's administrative centre) by road.

References 

Rural localities in Alsheyevsky District